Federico Delbonis and Máximo González were the defending champions and successfully defended the title, defeating Luke Bambridge and Jonny O'Mara in the final, 6–4, 6–3.

Seeds

Draw

Draw

References

 Main draw

Brasil Open - Doubles
2019 Brasil Open